Sanna Nyassi (born 31 January 1989) is a Gambian professional footballer who plays as a forward. He played for the Gambia national team from 2010 to 2015, making fourteen appearances.

Club career

Gambia Ports Authority 
Nyassi began his professional career in 2004 with Gambia Ports Authority of the GFA League First Division. The midfielder remained with the club through the 2007 season, helping the club capture the 2007 Gambian FA Cup, and scoring the game-winning goal in the final.

Nyassi's play with the Gambian Under-20 National Team sparked interest among many Major League Soccer clubs. In late 2007 Nyassi was on trial with New England Revolution, the club that signed his twin brother Sainey.

Seattle Sounders FC 
Following a trial spell with newly formed Seattle Sounders FC, Sanna became the third player signed by the club. He was subsequently loaned to Seattle Sounders for the remainder of the 2008 season, prior to Seattle Sounders FC's MLS debut in 2009. On 5 October 2010 Nyassi scored two goals in the final of the 2010 Lamar Hunt US Open Cup Final to help Seattle to a 2–1 victory over Columbus Crew and capture its second straight Cup title. He became the first player in modern history to score multiple goals in the Cup final and was named Player of The Round as a result.

Vancouver Whitecaps FC & Colorado Rapids 
On 24 November 2010, Nyassi was selected by Vancouver Whitecaps FC as their first pick in the 2010 MLS Expansion Draft but he was immediately traded to Colorado Rapids for an international roster slot. On 20 July in a match versus New York Red Bulls, Nyassi scored his first MLS hat-trick and his first three goals for Colorado. His fourth goal of the season came on 29 July against Philadelphia Union. Strike partner Omar Cummings set up Nyassi with a lovely through ball and the Gambian scored with a curling shot to put his side 2–0 up.

Montreal Impact, Chicago Fire 
Nyassi was left exposed by Colorado in the 2011 MLS Expansion Draft and was selected by expansion side Montreal Impact. Nyassi spent 2 1/2 seasons with Montreal before being traded to Chicago Fire on 29 July 2014 in exchange for midfielder Dilly Duka.

San Jose Earthquakes 
Chicago cut ties with Nyassi at the conclusion of the 2014 season and he entered the 2014 MLS Re-Entry Draft. In December 2014, Nyassi was selected by San Jose Earthquakes in stage two of the draft.

Penang FA 
In June 2017, Nyassi sign for Malaysian side Penang.

International career
Nyassi has represented his nation at various youth levels. He earned three caps playing for the Gambian U-17 national team in the 2005 African Under-17 Championship, scoring one goal against Burkina Faso. He also earned two caps for the U-20 national team in the 2007 FIFA U-20 World Cup. In 2010, he made his debut for the full national team.

Personal life 
Sanna is the twin brother of footballer Sainey Nyassi.

Nyassi holds U.S. citizenship.

Career statistics

Honours
Gambia Ports Authority
Gambian Championnat National D1 (1): 2006
Gambian Cup (1): 2007
Seattle Sounders FC
Lamar Hunt US Open Cup (2): 2009, 2010
Montreal Impact
Canadian Championship (2): 2013, 2014
Individual
Named MLS Humanitarian of the Month in April 2010
MLS Player of the Week; for Week 19, 2011

References

External links

1989 births
Living people
Gambian footballers
The Gambia international footballers
The Gambia youth international footballers
Association football wingers
Identical twins
Seattle Sounders (1994–2008) players
Seattle Sounders FC players
Colorado Rapids players
CF Montréal players
Chicago Fire FC players
San Jose Earthquakes players
Gambian twins
USL First Division players
Major League Soccer players
Expatriate soccer players in the United States
Expatriate soccer players in Canada
Gambian expatriate footballers
Gambian expatriate sportspeople in the United States
Gambian expatriate sportspeople in Canada
Gambia Ports Authority FC players
Penang F.C. players
Gambian expatriate sportspeople in Malaysia
Expatriate footballers in Malaysia